Euciroidae is a taxonomic family of saltwater clams, marine bivalve molluscs in the superfamily Verticordioidea.

Genera and species 
Genera and species within the family Euciroidae include:

 Euciroa Dall, 1881
 Euciroa crassa Jaeckel & Thiele, 1931
 Euciroa eburnea (Wood-Mason & Alcock, 1891)
 Euciroa elegantissima (Dall, 1881)
 Euciroa galatheae (Dell, 1956)
 Euciroa granifera (Cotton, 1931)
 Euciroa lamprelli M. Huber, 2010
 Euciroa millegemmata Kuroda & Habe in Kuroda, 1952
 Euciroa pacifica Dall, 1895
 Euciroa queenslandica Lamprell & Healy, 1997
 Euciroa rostrata Jaeckel & Thiele, 1931
 Euciroa spinosa Jaeckel & Thiele, 1931
 Euciroa subspinosa Okutani, 2006
 Euciroa trapeza Poutiers, 1982

Anomalodesmata
Bivalve families